The Port and Airport Development Strategy (PADS) is an infrastructure project in Hong Kong. It is better known as the Rose Garden Project.

Background
In the early 1980s, the Hong Kong Government already foresaw the incapability of the existing airport and container port to keep up with the growth of Hong Kong. The blueprints for the new airport and container port had already been drawn. However, the government decided to postpone the plan owing to the uncertainty of Hong Kong's future.

After the Tiananmen Square protests of 1989, the government reproposed the plan in order to restore confidence among Hong Kong's populace. It presented a rosy picture for the future to the Hong Kong people in order to halt the wave of emigration.

Infrastructure
 Airport Core Programme (ACP) in North Lantau
 New container ports in Kwai Chung, Stonecutters Island, Tsing Yi Island and East Lantau (plans for the East Lantau port were later abandoned)
 Railways
 Highways

Politics
The government of People's Republic of China (PRC) cast a great concern in the project for fear that the British would withdraw the monetary reserve of Hong Kong to Britain before the reunification with China 1997. There was a lengthy series of conferences on the matter. Some Chinese officials also urged a downscaling of the project such as building one runway at the airport instead of two.

Transport in Hong Kong
Urban planning in Hong Kong